2MASS J10475385+2124234 (abbreviated to 2MASS J1047+21) is a brown dwarf of spectral class T6.5, in the constellation Leo about 34 light-years from Earth, hence in galactic topographical and interstellar medium study terms being in the Local Bubble and very nearby in the Orion Arm. It is the first brown dwarf to have an inferred range of its typical wind speeds computed.

Discovery 
2MASS J1047+21 was discovered in 1999 along with eight other brown dwarf candidates by Adam J. Burgasser et al. from Two Micron All-Sky Survey (2MASS), conducted from 1997 to 2001. Follow-up observations with the Keck I 10-meter telescope's Near Infrared Camera (NIRC) were conducted on 27 May 1999 and identified methane in 2MASS J1047+21's near-infrared spectrum, classifying it as a T-type brown dwarf.

Methodology
The wind speed is directly inferred from minute, regular cycles in its visible (which matches its ultra-violet) appearance compared to the same at radio wave spectra. The radio emissions are coming from electrons interacting with the magnetic field, which is rooted deep in the interior. The visible and infrared (IR) data, on the other hand, reveal what's happening in the gas giant's cloud tops.

Distance 

Characteristics 

2MASS J1047+21 is a T-type brown dwarf.

Wind speeds 

Wind speeds on 2MASS J1047+21 were measured to be  by the Spitzer Space Telescope.

References

External links 

 In a First, NASA Measures Wind Speed on a Brown Dwarf, Calla Cofield, Jet Propulsion Laboratory, 9 Apr 2020
 Astronomers Measure Wind Speed on a Brown Dwarf, Dave Finley, National Radio Astronomy Observatory, 9 Apr 2020
 Planet 2MASS J10475385+2124234, The Extrasolar Planets Encyclopaedia
 Astronomers measure wind speed on a brown dwarf, Phys.org, 9 Apr 2020
 Astronomers Measure the Wind Speed on a Brown Dwarf for the First Time. Spoiler: Insanely Fast, Evan Gough, Universe Today, 15 Apr 2020

Leo (constellation)
Brown dwarfs
T-type stars
J10475385+2124234
Astronomical objects discovered in 1999
TIC objects